The Jetour Dashing (大圣) is a compact crossover produced by Jetour from 2022. Jetour is a brand launched in 2018 by Chery. The Jetour Dasheng is the first vehicle to be based on the Kunlun Architecture of the Jetour brand.

Overview

The Jetour Dasheng is available as both conventional gasolines and PHEV plug-in hybrid versions. The conventional gasoline version comes with two engine options with a 1.5-litre turbo engine mated to a 6-speed manual transmission or a 6-speed dual clutch transmission or a 1.6-litre turbo engine mated to a 7-speed CDT gearbox. The 1.5-litre turbo engine has a maximum power output of 156hp and a peak torque of 230Nm. The 1.6-litre turbo engine develops a maximum power of 197hp and a peak torque of 290Nm. The PHEV version is equipped with a 1.5-litre turbo engine and a 3-gear DHT gearbox delivering a maximum power of 326 horsepower and peak torque of 565Nm, while featuring a pure electric cruising range of 100km, and fuel consumption of 1L/100km.

The interior of Jetour Dasheng features a central 15.6-inch control screen and is equipped with the third-generation Snapdragon high-performance chip. The infotainment system supports AutoNavi, Tencent, and Baidu Maps. The Dasheng's interior also comes with an 8-inch LCD screen, HUD head-up display, a flat-bottom steering wheel design, voice recognition system, wireless charging pad on the center console, and Level2+ driving assistance functions with cruise control and lane change. The Jetour Dasheng also features a negative ion fresh air system that has passed the CN95 high-efficiency filter element to create a PM2.5 level inside the vehicle.

References

External links

Compact sport utility vehicles
Crossover sport utility vehicles
Cars introduced in 2022
Cars of China